Maula Kalika is a famous Hindu temple of Goddess Kalika in Gaindakot town of Nawalpur district in Gandaki province of Nepal.

History
Historically, it is said that in the 16th century the King of Palpa created a symbolic offering site ("Maula") in the name of goddess Kalika after which the name of the mountain (Maula hill) was derived.

It is believed, in Hindu mythology that the Goddess Kali or Kalika also called Durga is the symbol of energy, power and new beginning.

The temple has been renovated several times by the local people. The base area has been widened to adjust for more visitors.

The temple management has lately decided to stop sacrificing the animals.

Popularity
Local people in Gaindakot have been worshipping at the Maula Kalika for many centuries before it got widespread popularity. The current temple was built in the early 1990s.

Hundreds of thousands of people visit Maula Kalika every year from Nepal and neighbouring countries. Dashain festival in September–October and in March–April are peak seasons when the goddess Kalika or Kali (also called Nav Durga, the 9 different incarnations of Goddess Kalika) is worshipped during these festive seasons.

Former President of Nepal Dr. Ram Baran Yadav, former King/Princes and High Ranking Government Officials including Finance Minister Ram Saran Mahat of Nepal have visited the temple. World-famous Yoga guru Baba Ramdev from India visited the temple in 2011. Nepal's First women president Shrimati Bidhya Devi Bhandari visited the temple on 20 April 2016 and inaugurated the temples residential facilities.

Hiking

Regular visitors from Gaindakot and nearby Chitwan choose this place as a destination to enhance their leisure time with the feel of the cool breeze, observation of wide panoramic views of wilderness, and the exciting adventure of walking through 500 meters long sloping and curving stairs to attain the height of the final destination.

Visitors enjoy panoramic views of Narayani River, Gaindakot town and Chitwan Valley on the south of the hill. Mt. Manaslu can be viewed on the north side. Hikers also prefer to visit the temple for the sunrise view early in the morning.

It takes less than half a day for a round trip hiking from Narayangarh town traveling on foot. From the bottom of the Maula hill, it only requires less than 4 hours to go up and down. Mineral water and refreshments are available on the way, near Deurali where there is a helipad too.

Connectivity
Nepal Telecom has installed a wireless transceiver tower. You can enjoy GSM, CDMA phone calls and 3G connectivity. Even the signals are good for your roaming services.

Water Supply and electricity
An automated hydraulic pressure continuously pumps water to the peak. The equipment is installed on the northern slope, 500 meters down. Water supply is continuous and unmonitored.

It has pole-based electricity wires pulled through the base of Gaindakot.

Transportation
The visitors to the temple can several options to reach the top. If you have small-sized vehicles, you can leave them at the parking facilities. Public transportation is available from several connecting locations nearby the area to the base of the mountain.

Foot Trails
Walking/climbing the hill is a popular way to get there. The foot trails were maintained by local labour contributions. It takes about 30 minutes for experts and about 2 hours for newcomers to reach the top. You can enjoy the sightseeing, shop for fruits, and drink natural water or rest in those foot trails.

Cable Car
The infrastructures for the Cable Car are under construction since 2021.

By Air
The closest domestic airport is Bharatpur Airport, where daily flights are available to and from Kathmandu and Pokhara. It takes less than an hour from Kathmandu airport (Tribhuvan International Airport) to reach Bharatpur (near Gaindakot) on air. The temple area has a Helipad as well within a few minutes' walking distances (called Deurali).

Social Issues
Visiting the temple is considered for several reasons.

Funding

The temple receives continuous donations from several parties, business persons, and from family members in memories of lost relatives or parents. The fund is used for the maintenance of the territory. If the donation reaches some minimum standard of amount, the donor's name will be printed on a marble board for permanent records to display to the public.

The temple raises the funds through such activities:
 Forest handover from Government of Nepal
 Regional development funds
 Labor Force contribution by Nepalese Army and Nepal Police
 Various forms of donations
 Rents collection from physical infrastructures
 Pigeons sales
 Sales of worshipped items
 Lifetime memberships
 Interests received from Fixed deposits

Cultural Benefits

People of any religious background are welcome. This gives a lot of chances to union with friends, relatives, tourists and anyone interested in the historic beliefs. The foot trails and temple areas are very busy during the religious seasons. About 18,000 people visit this area per day during the peak seasons.

Photo Gallery 
Stone carvings and arts on the Maulakalika temple foot trail.

See also
 Pashupatinath Temple
 Swayambhu
 Manakamana
 Daunne Devi Temple

References

External links
 Maula Kalika Temple Official Homepage in Nepali Language
 Maula Kalika Temple background in Nepali Language

Kali temples
Hindu temples in Gandaki Province
Tourist attractions in Nepal
Buildings and structures in Nawalpur District
1990s establishments in Nepal